Laura M Padilla-Walker is an American developmental psychologist and academic administrator. She is a professor in the School of Family Life at Brigham Young University. She was an associate dean for the BYU College of Family, Home and Social Sciences from 2017-2021 until she became the dean in July 2021.

Early life, education, and career 
Padilla-Walker received her bachelor's degree from Central Michigan University in 1999, and both her master's (2001) and PhD. (2005) in developmental psychology from the University of Nebraska-Lincoln. Her thesis was " Perceived appropriateness and accurate perception of parental messages as predictors of adolescents' internalization of values and behaviors".

Publications

Books
Padilla-Walker, Laura M., and Gustavo Carlo. , editors. Prosocial Development: A Multidimensional Approach. Oxford: Oxford University Press 2016.  ISBN 9780199964772

Most cited journal articles
Padilla-Walker LM, Nelson LJ. Black hawk down?: Establishing helicopter parenting as a distinct construct from other forms of parental control during emerging adulthood. Journal of adolescence. 2012 Oct 1;35(5):1177-90. (Cited 500 times, according to Google Scholar) '
Carroll JS, Padilla-Walker LM, Nelson LJ, Olson CD, McNamara Barry C, Madsen SD. Generation XXX: Pornography acceptance and use among emerging adults. Journal of adolescent research. 2008 Jan;23(1):6-30. (Cited 775 times, according to Google Scholar.)  
Coyne SM, Padilla-Walker LM, Howard E. Emerging in a digital world: A decade review of media use, effects, and gratifications in emerging adulthood. Emerging Adulthood. 2013 Jun;1(2):125-37. (Cited 313 times, according to Google Scholar.)  
Day RD, Padilla-Walker LM. Mother and father connectedness and involvement during early adolescence. Journal of Family Psychology. 2009 Dec;23(6):900. (Cited 278 times, according to Google Scholar.)  
Padilla‐Walker LM, Christensen KJ. Empathy and self‐regulation as mediators between parenting and adolescents' prosocial behavior toward strangers, friends, and family. Journal of Research on Adolescence. 2011 Sep;21(3):545-51.(Cited 243 times, according to Google Scholar.)

Padilla-Walker has over 100 journal publications and has co-edited three volumes with Oxford University Press.

Awards and achievements 
In 2010, Padilla-Walker received the Camilla Eyring Kimball Professorship from 2019 to 2024

References

External links
Laura Padilla-Walker at the Family Home & Social Sciences
Laura Padilla Walker at the School of Family Life

Brigham Young University faculty
American women psychologists
Year of birth missing (living people)
Living people
American university and college faculty deans
Women deans (academic)
American developmental psychologists
University of Nebraska–Lincoln alumni
Central Michigan University alumni
21st-century American psychologists